Gustav Wilhelm Becking (4 March 1894 – 9 May 1945) was a German musicologist who studied with Wolf and Hugo Riemann. Becking did his doctorate in 1920. He worked as a professor at Utrecht from 1929, in Prague from 1930 according to The New Grove.

Becking was, along with Joseph and Otmar Rutz, Eduard Sievers, and Alexander Truslit, one of the pioneers of composer pulse theory. This theory combines the rhythmic patterns in music with physical movement. The latter can be represented with conducting curves, so called Becking curves. Becking classified these curves into three categories in which all composers can be placed (Rink 1995 : 64-77).

References 
 Gustav Becking (1928/2011): How Musical Rhythm Reveals Human Attitudes. An Annotated Translation by Nigel Nettheim, Peter Lang. (URL: http://www.peterlang.com/) 
 Rink, John (editor) (1995): The Practise of Performance, Cambridge University Press
 Geiringer/Turner/Potter (2006): 'Gustav Becking', Grove Music Online. L. Macy (ed.). (URL: http://www.grovemusic.com )

1894 births
1945 deaths
Academic staff of Charles University
German expatriates in the Czech lands
German expatriates in the Czech Republic
German expatriates in Czechoslovakia
Writers from Bremen
20th-century German musicologists
Members of the Göttingen Academy of Sciences and Humanities